The 1822 Rhode Island gubernatorial election was an uncontested election held on April 17, 1822 to elect the Governor of Rhode Island. William C. Gibbs, the Democratic-Republican nominee, was the only candidate and so won with 100% of the vote.

General election

Candidates
William C. Gibbs, Governor since 1821.

Results

County results

References

Rhode Island gubernatorial elections
1822 Rhode Island elections
Rhode Island
April 1822 events